Augusto Martínez Olmedilla (1880 – 26 September 1965) was a Spanish writer and journalist.

Olmedilla was born in Madrid. A prolific writer, he contributed to periodicals including Blanco y Negro, La Esfera and Nuevo Mundo and was the author of over 30 novels, over 70 short novels and some 40 plays.

External links
 

1880 births
1965 deaths
Writers from Madrid
Spanish male dramatists and playwrights
Spanish novelists
Spanish male novelists
20th-century Spanish novelists
20th-century Spanish dramatists and playwrights
20th-century Spanish male writers